Ikare is a town in the northern senatorial part of Ondo State, Nigeria.

Ikare-Akoko (Ikare for short), town in southwestern Nigeria, is located in the Northern Senatorial District of Ondo State. Ikare is about 100 km from Akure, the Ondo State capital. The city was the divisional headquarters of the old Akoko Division, comprising Oka-Akoko, Isua-Akoko, Okeagbe-Akoko Ugbe Akoko etc. Based on the Local Government System now practised in Nigeria, the city is currently the headquarters of Akoko North-East Local Government. The city is a trading area for farmers of Kolanut,Cocoa, and coffee.

Ikare shares boundaries with Arigidi, Ugbe Akoko, Ogbagi, Oka, Akungba and Supare.

Ikare consists of two first class kings: The Owa-Ale of Iyometa Oba Adeleke Adegbite-Adedoyin Adefemi and Oba Saliu Momoh Akadiri Olukare of Ikare-Akoko

Osele market is the Ikare's biggest communal market where the city's ancient traditions are displayed, Ikare-Akoko.
Oja Oba is situated in opposite old first Bank, garage Ikare akoko.  The city is located in the Yoruba cultural region and has a substantial Christian, Jehovah Witness and Muslim population with several Churches, worshiping halls and Mosques. The architectural style of the city incorporates both Portuguese and Arabic styles. The Portuguese style was introduced in the 16th century when Portugal began to export slaves from the region. Arabic influences were incorporated in the 19th century with the diffusion of Islamic culture Southward across the Sahara.Population as of 2006 was over 700,000.

Ikare has been using electricity since the year 1956.

Education

Ikare is home to several educational institutions in Ondo State. Notable among which are; Agolo High School, Odo, Ikare, Mount Carmel Secondary School, Ondo State College of Art and Science {now Federal Technical College, Okegbe quarters, Ikare}; Ansar Ud-Deen Grammar School (AUD) Ikare Akoko, Agbaode Orimolade Grammar school Ikare; Osele High School Ikare Akoko, Victory College Ikare; Lennon Jubilee High School Ikare; Ikare Grammar School Ikare Akoko, Everlasting Premier College Ikare Akoko, Citadel International College, Ikare; Comprehensive high School, Ikare; Greater Tomorrow Primary School and so many government and private-owned Primary and Secondary Schools. Ikare sons and daughters are well educated and are presently holding national and international positions.

Markets

Ikare is a chief commercial city in Ondo state with several industrial base and markets which include; Osele Market, Okore Market, Oja Owa, Oja Oba, Jubilee Market, Oja Kajola Oja Kowode and several other markets in adjoining Villages. It is a super city for successful transportation business especially by private individuals.

Inter ethnic relationships

Ikare though basically a Yoruba ethnic city, is also a place of convergence in Ondo State for many ethnic groups in Nigeria including the Igbo, Hausa, Fulani, and Ijaw. The friendly disposition of its natives to visitors and holiday makers, from time immemorial, is perhaps responsible for the growing number of settlers in the city.

See also
Akungba
Oka Akoko
Akoko
Ugbe Akoko

References

Populated places in Ondo State
Towns in Yorubaland